Amphipyra stix is a moth in the family Noctuidae. It is found on the Balkan Peninsula and in Turkey, Iran, Lebanon, Armenia and Israel.

The wingspan is 29–35 mm. The forewings are dark grey to brown with a yellowish-grey to whitish-grey submarginal area. The hindwings are uniform whitish-grey, but somewhat darker on the edge. There is one generation per year with adults on wing from June to August.

References

External links
Lepiforum e.V.
 

Moths described in 1850
Amphipyrinae
Moths of Europe
Moths of Asia